Brian J. Holmes (born January 25, 1990) is an American soccer player who currently plays for Phoenix FC in the USL Professional Division.

External links
 

1990 births
Living people
American soccer players
Phoenix FC players
USL Championship players
Soccer players from Arizona
Association football defenders
Association football midfielders